Nantclwyd y Dre (previously known as Tŷ Nantclwyd) is a Grade 1 listed house in Ruthin, Denbighshire. It is Wales's oldest dated timbered town house, and is owned by the county and open to the public as a historic house museum.

History
Carbon dating of the timbers of the house have shown that the core structure was started in 1435/1436. This dates the property to the time after the destruction wrought by the army of Welsh prince Owain Glyndŵr, and the English-sponsored rebuilding of the affected Welsh towns.

In the 15th century Ruthin was a regional centre for weaving, and the land on which the house now stands then belonged to Welsh weaver Goronwy ap Madog and his English wife Suzanna. The earliest part of the structure shows it to be part of a 15th-century cruck framed hall house which occupied the southern part of the present street-frontage, built using timber felled in the winter of 1434–5. The position of the structure as well as the width of the inner garden to the rear, suggest that the site was originally two burgage plots which dated from when the town was laid out in the 13th century, but were then combined to allow construction of the hall house.

Following Jacobean era enlargement, the major late Stuart period addition includes the distinctive pillared porch. The name Nantclwyd y Dre was probably bestowed on the property in the 1720s. During the Georgian era, the local Wynne family restored the property to habitable status. It was then converted into a girls school in the Victorian era, and from 1834 it also became the local lodge for visiting judges.

In 1925, existing tenant and retired civil engineer Clinton Holme bought the house, and in 1928 he removed the exterior render to expose the timber frames. He sold the property to Samuel Dyer Gough who continued the restoration, and made it into the local hub for the Arts and Crafts movement.

Museum
In 1984 Dyer Gough's widow sold the house and its gardens to Clwyd County Council. From the mid-2000s, successor administration Denbighshire County Council started work on preserving the property. Converted into a living history museum, it displays demonstrate the changing fashions and the lives of the house's residents under the theme of the "Seven ages of Nantclwyd y Dre":
1942 hall
1916 rector's study
1891 schoolroom
Georgian panelled bedroom suite with Chinese-wallpaper
1690 "cabinet" of Stuart owner Eubule Thelwall (c. 1622 - 1695), with its "Kidderminster stuff" hangings and plaster ceiling
Jacobean bedchamber with hung bed, painted cloths, and "stool of ease" in its closet
15th century "business room", its 1435 structure virtually unchanged, showing the preserved documentation of a mediaeval resident' pilgrimage to Rome, founded during restoration within the buildings infrastructure

Opened to the public on 23 June 2007, visitors can also observe a colony of Lesser horseshoe bats in the attic rooms via a "bat cam".

Lord's garden

Behind the house are two gardens, the inner garden and the outer Lord's Garden. The inner 13th century garden occupies the area to the rear of the house, and is bounded by a substantial masonry wall.

The outer Lord's Garden is originally believed to have been part of a 13th-century developed castle garden. It became part of Nantclwyd y Dre after being rented by house owner Eubule Thelwall, who bought it in 1691. A 1780 plan shows both outer and inner paths, creating four roughly equal areas in the northern section, and what may have been an ornamental feature in the centre. In the south-west corner is a surviving substantial mound. Larger than depicted in the 1780 plans, 1980s archeological excavations suggest that the eastern section comprises spoil excavated during the construction of a swimming pool in the courtyard area. The older western section of the mound dates pre-18th century, suggesting that it may have been either an artillery position associated with the Civil War siege of the town, or a later garden platform with views over the gardens, gazebo and onwards towards the castle.

Restored in the 18th century, Lord's Garden is now itself Grade II listed. However, at present there is no public access, and the garden lies in a semi-neglected state. In December 2013, the council successfully applied for a grant of £177,600 from the Heritage Lottery Fund, which will see Lord's Garden restored and opened to the public by 2015.

The borders along either side of the garden now contain carefully selected plants representative of a 17th-century garden including crown imperials, old rose varieties and lilies.

Examples of content

The Porch on Stilts

The distinctive porch on stilts with chamber above was added to the original mediaeval street frontage in about 1693 by Eubule Thelwall, as was shown by tree ring dating of four samples. There is a fine surviving monument to Thelwall in Llanelidan Church. At the same time he built Nantclwyd Hall; the land was acquired through his marriage to the Parry heiress.

Archaeological finds

This cabinet contains finds of interest from the Lord's Garden. The Clwyd Powys Archaeological Trust had an exploratory excavation in the Lord's Garden in late winter 2013 and here is a sample of the type of items found.

Samuel Dyer Gough’s Chair

A unique handmade multifunctional recliner chair made by Mr. S. Dyer Gough who lived at Nantclwyd y Dre between 1926 and 1984, with his wife Jean and family. He was an architect, craftsman and historian and they made a big impact on Nantclwyd y Dre during the 50 years of their ownership. They were the last family that lived in the house.

Staffordshire Figures

A collection of traditional Staffordshire figures and willow pattern china as found in the house during the Dyer Goughs period.

Bottle jacks

An important kitchen innovation of the time. A clockwork device that enabled meat to be turned and roasted in front of the fire.

Four  carved panels flanking the fireplace

These four high-quality carved oak panels have been dated, and while the trees were felled soon after 1423, their carving style suggests a later date of 15-16th century. Despite the fleur de lys motifs on the shields in the panels, the timber is likely of Welsh origin (most probably from nearby Coed Marchan wood),  and unlikely to be continental. The carvings most likely honoured Arthur (1486–1502), eldest son of Henry VII.

The Arms of Ednyfed Fychan

Attributed arms of Ednyfed Fychan (an ancestor of Owen Tudor), used and quartered by Wynne of Coed Coch and of Plas Uchaf. Description: "Gules a chevron ermine between three men's heads in profile erased proper." The ermine can also be seen on the national flag of Brittany. Ednyfed is said to have first come to notice in battle, fighting against the army of Ranulph de Blondeville, 4th Earl of Chester, who attacked Llywelyn at the behest of King John of England. Ednyfed cut off the heads of three English lords in battle and carried them, still bloody, to Llywelyn, who commanded him to change his family coat of arms to display three heads in memory of the feat.

Wattle and Daub Panel

An example of the mediaeval horizontal hazel-wattle between the oak beams. They were 'sprung' into groves cut into the frame and interwoven round upright oak 'spars' also sprung into the frame. This exposed piece dates to c. 1435.

Ericsson 1905 Magneto Telephone

Nantclwyd House was the first house on Castle Street to have a telephone installed. The Rev. Thomas Pritchard lived here from 1907 to 1917 – he was the Rector of Llanfwrog Church. The wooden case held two batteries that worked the microphone. By turning the handle of the Magneto a bell would ring in the exchange and the person would tell the operator which number they wanted to be connected to. Electricity arrived at Nantclwyd at around 1914, provided by the Ruthin Electricity Supply Company.

A Victorian Teacher’s Desk

Between 1886 and 1893 Nantclwyd y Dre was run as Miss Charlotte Price's school for young ladies – daughters of the more prosperous tradespeople of Ruthin. The room is set as if they were to have a needlework lesson, showing typical needlework skills the girls would be learning, before they moved on to Ruthin County School at the age of 11 (now Ysgol Brynhyfryd).

Changing room in the Georgian Bedchamber 

This room was used as a changing room alongside the grandest bedchamber which was created during the Georgian updating by the Wynne family around 1734. The wallpaper reflects the craze for Chinese influence patterns around this time and is a hand-blocked reproduction of an English wallpaper design c.1750-1760. The occupants would have used chamber pots, stored in pot-cupboards, as seen here.

Stool of ease or commode

A 17th century toilet consisting of a chamber pot set inside a lidded seat. It is found in the ensuite of the Jacobean bedchamber. This is a copy of a 17th-century original now displayed at Plas Mawr, Conwy. Such stools of ease - which are basically a lidded box containing a chamber pot - became popular in Elizabethan times as they were much more convenient than a trip to an outside privy.

Table in the Jacobean Room

The table is set for dinner with its lovely pewter tableware and napery, real status symbols for the Parry family who added this room and the little ensuite next to it in about 1620. Tableware includes: pewter candlesticks,  plates and porringers, a pewter ewer (or jug) and a basin for hand washing before and after meals, a pair of facon de Venise drinking glasses, Bellarmines salt glazed stoneware flagons and Rhineland imported drinking jugs.

Eubule Thelwall’s Study

This ornate plaster work ceiling was installed when this room was added to Nantclwyd y Dre's original street frontage in c.1663 by Eubule Thelwall. The plasterwork motifs include mulberries and pears. This type of plasterwork was very popular in 1660-70s. Eubule Thelwall was a keen gardener. To the right of the doorway is the remains of what was at one time the outside wall of the old house.

Mediaeval Chamber

This room is part of the original mediaeval hallhouse – lovely simple hardwearing furniture with a typical scribe's desk. Typical mediaeval waxed canvas window coverings called  fenestrals were used to keep out as much of the weather as they could. The rushlights didn't give out much light!

The gazebo

The Grade II listed building at the end of the walled garden of Nantclwyd y Dre dates to the early 18th century and only appears on prints after 1715. The upper floor of the building was used as a study room by the three daughters of the Dyer-Gough family when they were growing up here in the 1940s. It still offers beautiful views out over the Vale of Clwyd on a clear day. The ground floor room is now made out as a potting shed complete with gardening books and early 20th century tools.

Ostrich plumes

White ostrich plumes top each corner of the four poster bed (called 'French bed' at that time) in the Jacobean chamber. These would have been the height of fashion in the early 17th century and would have adorned the bed to show the high status of its wealthy owner, Simon Parry. This 'corded' bed has three mattresses, a sign of high status as well as comfort. The bed is equipped with 'bedstaffs', which prevented piled bedclothes from falling off the bed.

The Hall Gallery

One of the most striking features of the house is the gallery which runs along two sides of the hall. The wood of the gallery has been dated to around the late 17th century and it is thought that the heraldic panels set into it, were added at a later date, most likely by the Wynne family. The main balustrades indicate a date of c. 1680–90, but the stairs balustrades could be somewhat later, possibly c. 1730. Mrs Jean Dyer Gogh informed RCAHM that the gallery had been taken from St Saeran at Llanynys which was re-ordered c. 1768 and a second theory is that it was taken from Llanelidan Church, but to date there is no evidence of either. A 2002 report by Richard Morriss, however, suggests that the gallery was made for nantclwyd y Dre, rather than imported which dates the gallery to Eubule Thelwall's alterations c. 1662–95. The heraldic  panels he dates at late 18th century.

Georgian dressing table

This is an original piece of Georgian furniture (c. 1720) and would have been an essential item in any Georgian lady's bedchamber. The name at the time would have been 'a chest on a stand'. This room was created in 1773 and the panelling is original to the house.

Attic Doorway

This doorway leads to the attics which were the servants’ quarters during the Georgian period. However, the door is now kept locked and the attics undisturbed because it is now a bat roost. There are 3 species of bats living in the attics at Nantclwyd y Dre – pipistrelle, long eared and lesser horseshoe bats. The lesser horseshoes are the rarest and their colony size is estimated at 60 individuals.

Inscription behind parlour panelling

During the house restoration, an inscription was uncovered behind the wooden pearwood panelling in the parlour. Written in pencil it reads "John Edwards joiner Holywell 15th of May 1926". This implies that the old panelling was introduced to the house as late as 1926.

Inkwell

Pewter handmade inkwell that also serves as a calendar as it has rotating rings around the base to adjust the day, date and month. Possibly Italian.

Gallery

References

External links

Nantclwyd y Dre @ Denbighshire Council

Houses completed in 1436
Grade I listed buildings in Denbighshire
Ruthin
Houses in Denbighshire
Museums in Denbighshire
Historic house museums in Wales